Bayou Lafourche, originally called Chetimachas River or La Fourche des Chetimaches, (the fork of the Chitimacha), is a  bayou in southeastern Louisiana, United States, that flows into the Gulf of Mexico. The bayou is flanked by Louisiana Highway 1 on the west and Louisiana Highway 308 on the east, and is known as "the longest Main Street in the world." It flows through parts of Ascension, Assumption, and Lafourche parishes. Today, approximately 300,000 Louisiana residents drink water drawn from the bayou.

History
The name Lafourche is from the French for "the fork", and alludes to the bayou's large outflow of Mississippi River water.  The first settlements of Acadians in southern Louisiana were near Bayou Lafourche and Bayou des Écores, which led to a close association of the bayou with Cajun culture.

It was formerly a Mississippi River outlet (distributary), but was dammed at Donaldsonville in 1905.  The dam cut off nourishment and replenishment of a huge wetland area of central Louisiana.  It changed the formerly flowing bayou into a stagnant ditch.

The Bollinger Shipyards, founded by Donald G. Bollinger, was launched on Bayou Lafourche in 1946.

On August 29, 2021, Hurricane Ida made landfall in Lafourche parish. Dam walls at the end of the bayou were closed to prevent a storm surge of salt water from entering.

Mississippi River reintroduction

A long-term project to revitalize Bayou Lafourche with an increased flow of fresh water from the Mississippi River and halt the accelerated loss of land down the bayou is currently in progress.

In 2016, Bayou Lafourche was dredged from Donaldsonville to Napoleonville of vegetation and sediment that constricted the surface area of the water. In Lockport, a water gate was constructed on Bayou Lafourche to mitigate the amount of salt water invading the bayou during periods of low tide. In 2021, a weir was removed in Thibodaux, allowing recreational boating passage through the entire bayou.

By 2025, a $96 million pumping station is set to be completed in Donaldsonville, next to the original that was constructed in 1950. The new station will be able to pump three times the amount of fresh water from the Mississippi River than the original and, in turn, return the flow of water throughout the bayou during low tides.

Crossings
From north to south, the following roads and railroads cross the bayou (almost all connecting LA 1 to LA 308):
LA 3089 (Albert Street) in Donaldsonville
Union Pacific Railroad Livonia Subdivision in Donaldsonville
Rondinaud Road in Donaldsonville
LA 943
LA 998 at Belle Rose
LA 70
LA 403 at Paincourtville
LA 70 Spur
Bridge Street at Plattenville
LA 402, Hospital Rd. at Napoleonville
former Texas and Pacific Railway (now open to non-motorized traffic)
LA 1008 at Napoleonville
LA 1010 at Ingleside
LA 1011 at Supreme
LA 1247 at Labadieville
St. John Bridge
LA 3185
Tiger Drive
former railroad in Thibodaux
LA 20 (St. Patrick Street) in Thibodaux
Canal Boulevard in Thibodaux
Banker Drive (no motor vehicles) in Thibodaux
Audubon Avenue
LA 648
Lafourche Crossing, BNSF Railway/Union Pacific Railroad Lafayette Subdivision at Lafourche
LA 649 (St. Charles Swing Bridge) at St. Charles
Raceland Lift Span Bridge
LA 182 (Raceland Lift Bridge) at Raceland
US 90
former LA 364
LA 654 (Champagne-Harrelson Memorial Bridge)
LA 655 (Rita Bridge) at Lockport
LA 3220 (Bollinger Bridge)
Valentine Bridge at Valentine
T-Bois Bridge
Former LA 310 Pontoon Bridge at Larose
LA 657 Vertical Lift Bridge at Larose
Le Pont D'or Bridge at Larose
Cote Blanche Bridge at Cut Off
LA 3162 (South Lafourche Bridge) at Galliano, southern terminus of LA-308
Galliano Pontoon Bridge at Galliano
LA 308 (Golden Meadow Lift Bridge) in Golden Meadow
LA 1 (Gateway to the Gulf Expressway) at Leeville

In popular culture
The film Southern Comfort is set on Bayou Lafourche.

At the end of the novel Post Office by Charles Bukowski, protagonist Henry Chinaski quits his job at the Los Angeles post office to "pick up 10 or 20 grand for 3 months trapping at Bayou La Fourche. [...] Muskrats, nutria, mink, otter... coon. All I need is a pirogue."

In The CW Network's supernatural-fantasy series, The Originals, the Bayou Lafourche is a major setting and has acted as the home of the Werewolf encampments for decades after the Vampires exiled them from the city of New Orleans.

In the film Hard Target, the lead character Chance Boudreaux, played by Jean-Claude Van Damme, is a Cajun from Bayou Lafourche in Southern Louisiana.

See also

Nicholls State University
Battle of LaFourche Crossing

References

Wetlands and bayous of Louisiana
Dams in Louisiana
Rivers of Louisiana
Rivers of Ascension Parish, Louisiana
Bodies of water of Assumption Parish, Louisiana
Bodies of water of Lafourche Parish, Louisiana
Donaldsonville, Louisiana
Thibodaux, Louisiana